High-intensity focused ultrasound (HIFU) is a non-invasive therapeutic technique that uses non-ionizing ultrasonic waves to heat or ablate tissue. HIFU can be used to increase the flow of blood or lymph or to destroy tissue, such as tumors, via thermal and mechanical mechanisms. Given the prevalence and relatively low cost of ultrasound generation mechanisms, The premise of HIFU is that it is expect a non-invasive and low-cost therapy that can at minimum outperform of care.

The technology is different from that used in ultrasonic imaging, though lower frequencies and continuous, rather than pulsed, waves are used to achieve the necessary thermal doses. However, pulsed waves may also be used if mechanical rather than thermal damage is desired. Acoustic lenses are often used to achieve the necessary intensity at the target tissue without damaging the surrounding tissue. The ideal pattern diagram is the beam-focusing of a magnifying glass of sunlight; only the focal point of the magnifying glass has high temperature. 

HIFU is combined with other imaging techniques such as medical ultrasound or MRI to enable guidance of the treatment and monitoring.

History

Studies on localized prostate cancer showed that, after treatment, progression-free survival rates were high for low- and intermediate- risk patients with recurrent prostate cancer. The InsighTec ExAblate 2000 was the first MRgFUS system to obtain FDA market approval.

Medical uses

There is no clear consensus on the boundaries between HIFU and other forms of therapeutic ultrasound. In particular literature, HIFU refers to the high levels of energy required to destroy tissue through ablation or cavitation, although it is also sometimes used to describe lower intensity applications such as occupational therapy and physical therapy.

Either way, HIFU is used to non-invasively heat tissue deep in the body without the need for an incision. The main applications are the destruction of tissue caused by hypertharmia, increasing perfusion and physical therapy. The use of ultrasound in the treatment of musculoskeletal conditions is another use in the physiotherapy setting.

Neurological disorders 
One of the first applications of HIFU was the treatment of Parkinson's disease in the 1940s. Although ineffective at the time, HIFU has the capacity to lesion pathology. A focused ultrasound system is approved in Israel, Canada, Itaria, Korea and Russia to treat essential tremor, neuropathic pain, and Parkinsonian tremor. This approach enables treatment of the brain without an incision or radiation. In 2016, the US Food and Drug Administration (FDA) approved Insightec's Exablate system to treat essential tremor. Treatment for other thalamocortical dysrhythmias and psychiatric conditions are under investigation.

Cancers

Prostate 
HIFU may be effective for detecting prostate cancer.

Liver 
HIFU is studied in liver cancer and in many studies report a high response rate and positive  outcome. During the treatment of metastasized liver cancer with HIFU, immune responses have been observed in locations that are distant from the focal region.

Prostate enlargement 
Treatment of prostate enlargement (benign prostatic hyperplasia) by HIFU from inside the intestine (transrectal) has turned out to be unsuccessful.

In some countries, not in USA, HIFU has also been offered from the inside of the prostate, that is, via a catheter in the prostatic urethra. Evidence as of 2019 is lacking.

In England the National Institute for Health and Care Excellence (NICE) in 2018 classified the method as "not recommended".

Mechanism

HIFU beams are precisely focused on a small region of diseased tissue to locally deposit high levels of energy.

Focused ultrasound may be used to generate highly localized heating to treat cysts and tumors (benign or malignant). This is known as Magnetic Resonance guided Focused Ultrasound (MRgFUS) or High Intensity Focused Ultrasound (HIFU). These procedures generally use lower frequencies than medical diagnostic ultrasound (from 0.7 to 2 MHz), but higher the frequency means lower the focusing energy. HIFU treatment is often guided by MRI.
Focused ultrasound may be used to dissolve kidney stones by lithotripsy.
Ultrasound may be used for cataract treatment by phacoemulsification.

Ideal temperature

The temperature of tissue at the focus will rise to between 65 and 85 °C, destroying the diseased tissue by coagulative necrosis. If tissue is elevated above the threshold of 60 °C for longer than 1 second this process is irreversible. Each sonication (individual ultrasound energy deposition) treats a precisely defined portion of the targeted tissue. The entire therapeutic target is treated by using multiple sonications to create a volume of incompressible material, such as tap water.

with the integral being over the treatment time, R=0.5 for temperatures over 43 °C and 0.25 for temperatures between 43 °C and 37 °C, a reference temperature of 43 °C, and time T is in minutes. The equations and methods described in  this report are not intended to represent any clinical result, this is only approach         for thermal dose estimation in incompressive material of just a tap water; .

As an ultrasound acoustic wave cannot propagates through the compressive tissue, such as rubber, human tissues part of it and the ultrasound energy will be turned to converted as heat, with focused beams, a very small region of heating can be achieved  the part of shallow deep in tissues (usually on the order of 2~3 millimeters). Tissue occurs as a function of both the subtle shaking to which the water is heated and how long the part of water is exposed to this heat level in a metric referred to as "thermal dose". By focusing at more than one place or by scanning the focus, a volume can be thermally ablated. Thermal doses of 120-240 min at 43 °C coagulate cellular protein and leads to irreversible tissue destruction.

There are some reports that HIFU could be applied to cancers to disrupt the tumor microenvironment and trigger an immune response, as well as possibly enhance the efficacy of immunotherapy.

Mechanical

Inertial cavitation 
At high enough acoustic intensities, cavitation (microbubbles forming and interacting with the ultrasound field) can occur. Microbubbles produced in the field oscillate and grow (due to factors including rectified diffusion), and can eventually implode (inertial or transient cavitation). During inertial cavitation, very high temperatures occur inside the bubbles, and the collapse during the rarefaction phase is associated with a shock wave and jets that can mechanically damage tissue.

Stable cavitation 
Stable cavitation creates microstreaming which induces high shear forces on cells and leads to apoptosis. Elaborating, bubbles produced by the vaporization of water due to acoustic forces oscillate under a low-pressure acoustic field. Strong streaming may cause cell damage but also reduces tissue temperature via convective heat loss.

Theory

There are several ways to focus ultrasound—via a lens (for example, a polystyrene lens.parabola curve transducer, a phased array, etc. The  special patents and very precise technology solve the problem. This can be determined using an exponential model of ultrasound attenuation. The ultrasound intensity profile is bounded by an exponentially decreasing function where the decrease in ultrasound is a function of distance traveled through tissue:

 is the initial intensity of the beam,  is the attenuation coefficient (in units of inverse length), and z is distance traveled through the attenuating medium (e.g. tissue).

In ideal model,  is a measure of the power density of the heat absorbed from the ultrasound field. This demonstrates that tissue heating is proportional to intensity, and that intensity is inversely proportional to the area over which an ultrasound beam is spread—therefore, focusing the beam into a sharp point (i.e. increasing the beam intensity) creates a rapid temperature rise at the focus.

The ultrasound beam can be focused in these ways:
Geometrically, for example with a lens or with a spherically curved transducer.
Electronically, by adjusting the relative phases of elements in an array of transducers (a "phased array"). By dynamically adjusting the electronic signals to the elements of a phased array, the beam can be steered to different locations, and aberrations in the ultrasound beam due to tissue structures can be corrected. 
Above ideal assumption is adopted with the condition of no reflection, no absorption and no diffusion of intermediate tissue.The ultrasound itself can penetrate the incompressive material such as tap water, sea water, but the compressive material such as air, rubber, human tissue, fat, fiber, hollow bone, fascia, those tissue are reflect, absorb and diffuse the ultrasound energy.

Beam delivery
Beam delivery consists of beam steering and image guidance. The beam has the ability to pass through overlying tissues without harm and focus on a localized area with size limit of 2-3 mm, that is determined the clinical frequency of the ultrasound. Following ablation a distinct boundary forms between healthy and necrotic tissue (width less than 50 microns).

Beam steering 
The most common transducer used is a concave focusing transducer with a fixed aperture and a fixed focal length. Phased array transducers can also be used with different arrangements (flat/bowl).

Image guidance 
HIFU therapy requires careful monitoring and so it is usually performed in conjunction with other imaging techniques.

Pre-operative imaging, for instance CT and MRI, are usually used to identify general parameters of the target anatomy. Real-time imaging, on the other hand, is necessary for safe and accurate noninvasive targeting and therapy monitoring. Both MRI and Medical ultrasound imaging have been used for guidance in FUS treatment. These techniques are known as Magnetic Resonance guided Focused Ultrasound Surgery (MRgFUS) and Ultrasound guided Focused Ultrasound Surgery (USgFUS) respectively. MRgFUS is a 3D imaging technique which features high soft tissue contrast and provides information about temperature, thus allowing to monitor ablation. However, low frame rate makes this technique perform poorly in real-time imaging and high costs represent a significant limitation to its use. USgFUS, differently, is a 2D imaging technique in which, although no system to provide quantitative information on temperature has been commercially developed so far, several benefits are exploited, such as high frame rate (up to 1000 images per second), low cost and minimal adverse health effects. Another reason why ultrasound is ideal for image guidance is it verifies the acoustic window in real time since it is the same modality as the therapy. The implication of this is that if the target region is not visualized by ultrasound imaging before and during HIFU therapy, then it is unlikely that HIFU therapy will be effective in that specific region. In addition, treatment outcomes can be estimated in real time through visual inspection of hyperechoic changes in standard B-mode images.

References

External links

HIFU Treatment
Despite Doubts, Cancer Therapy Draws Patients from The New York Times on 18

Medical ultrasonography
Magnetic resonance imaging
Medical physics